Montgomery Township is the name of three townships in Indiana:
Montgomery Township, Gibson County, Indiana
Montgomery Township, Jennings County, Indiana
Montgomery Township, Owen County, Indiana

Indiana township disambiguation pages